Old Town Cemetery may refer to:

 Old Town Cemetery (Newburgh, New York), listed on the NRHP 
 Old Town Cemetery (Claiborne Parish, Louisiana)
or to cemeteries in any of many Old Towns in the U.S. or elsewhere

See also
Old Town (disambiguation)